Tricholoma resplendens is a fungus of the genus Tricholoma native to Europe and North America. It was originally described as   Agaricus resplendens by Elias Magnus Fries in 1857, and was given its current name by Petter Adolf Karsten in 1876.

The species has no odor, and is part of a group of Tricholoma species containing toxins which can cause severe gastrointestinal upset.

References 

resplendens
Fungi of Europe
Fungi of North America
Fungi described in 1857
Poisonous fungi
Taxa named by Elias Magnus Fries